The James Lick Telescope is a refracting telescope built in 1888. It has a lens  in diameter—a major achievement in its day. The instrument remains in operation and public viewing is allowed on a limited basis. Also called the "Great Lick Refractor" or simply "Lick Refractor", it was the largest refracting telescope in the world until 1897 and now ranks third, after the 40-inch refractor at the Yerkes Observatory and the Swedish 1-m Solar Telescope. The instrument is housed inside a dome that is powered by hydraulic systems that raise and lower the floor, rotate the dome and drive the clock mechanism to track the Earth's rotation. The original hydraulic arrangement still operates today, with the exception that the original wind-powered pumps that once filled the reservoirs have been replaced with electric pumps. James Lick is entombed below the floor of the observing room of the telescope.

Here are some excerpts from an 1894 book describing the telescope:

Construction

The fabrication of the two-element achromatic objective lens, the largest lens ever made at the time, caused years of delay. The famous large telescope maker Alvan Clark was in charge of the optical design. He gave the contract for casting the high quality optical glass blanks, of a size never before attempted, to the firm of Charles Feil in Paris. One of the huge glass disks broke during shipping, and making a replacement was delayed. Finally, after 18 failed attempts, the lens was finished, transported safely across country, and on December 31, 1887, was carefully installed in the telescope tube. The builders had to wait for three days for a break in the clouds to test it. On the evening of January 3 the telescope saw first light, and users found that the instrument couldn't be focused. An error in the estimation of the lens' focal length had caused the tube to be built too long. A hacksaw was procured, the great tube was unceremoniously cut back to the proper length and the star Aldebaran came into focus.

Contemporaries on debut

See also
List of largest optical telescopes in the 19th century

References

External links

 Photographs of the James Lick telescope from the Lick Observatory Records Digital Archive, UC Santa Cruz Library's Digital Collections

Great refractors
Lick Observatory
Optical telescopes